One Day International (ODI) cricket is played between international cricket teams who are Full Members of the International Cricket Council (ICC) as well as the top four Associate members. Unlike Test matches, ODIs consist of one inning per team, having a limit in the number of overs, currently 50 overs per innings – although in the past this has been 55 or 60 overs. ODI cricket is List-A cricket, so statistics and records set in ODI matches also count in List-A cricket records. The earliest match recognised as an ODI was played between England and Australia in January 1971; since when there have been over 4,000 ODIs played by 28 teams. 
This is a list of Indian Cricket team's One Day International records. It is based on the List of One Day International cricket records, but concentrates solely on records dealing with the Indian cricket team. India played its first ever ODI in 1974.

Key
The top five records are listed for each category, except for the team wins, losses, draws and ties, all round records and the partnership records. Tied records for fifth place are also included. Explanations of the general symbols and cricketing terms used in the list are given below. Specific details are provided in each category where appropriate. All records include matches played for India only, and are correct .

Team records

Overall Record 

Note: Tied matches considered as half win.

W/L ratio and win % excluded the matches which ended in No result.

Head-to-head records

First bilateral ODI series wins

First ODI match wins

Winning every match in a series 
In a bilateral series winning all matches is referred to as whitewash. First such event occurred when West Indies toured England in 1976. India have recorded 12 such series victories.

Losing every match in a series 
India have also suffered such whitewash five times.

Team scoring records

Most runs in an innings
The highest innings total scored in ODIs came in the match between England and Netherlands in June 2022. Playing in the first ODI at Amstelveen in Netherlands, England posted a total of 498/4. The fourth ODI of the 2011–12 series against the West Indies saw India set their highest innings total of 418/5.

Fewest runs in an innings
The lowest innings total scored in ODIs has been scored twice. Zimbabwe were dismissed for 35 by Sri Lanka during the third ODI in Sri Lanka's tour of Zimbabwe in April 2004 and USA were dismissed for same score by Nepal in the sixth ODI of the 2020 ICC Cricket World League 2 in Nepal in February 2020. The lowest score in ODI history for India is 54 scored in their final of the 2000 Coca-Cola Champions Trophy against Sri Lanka, which is joint tenth lowest of all time.

Most runs conceded an innings
The fifth ODI of the 2015 series against the South Africa saw India concede their highest innings total of 438/4.

Fewest runs conceded in an innings
The lowest score conceded by India for a full inning is 58 scored by Bangladesh in the second ODI of the 2014 series.

Most runs aggregate in a match
The highest match aggregate scored in ODIs came in the match between South Africa and Australia in the fifth ODI of March 2006 series at Wanderers Stadium, Johannesburg when South Africa scored 438/9 in response to Australia's 434/4. The first ODI of the 2009 series against Sri Lanka in Madhavrao Scindia Cricket Ground, Rajkot saw a total of 825 runs being scored.

Fewest runs aggregate in a match
The lowest match aggregate in ODIs is 71 when USA were dismissed for 35 by Nepal in the sixth ODI of the 2020 ICC Cricket World League 2 in Nepal in February 2020. The lowest match aggregate in ODI history for India is 127 scored ninth match of the 1980–81 Australia Tri-Nation Series against Australia, which is joint 11th lowest of all time.

Result records
An ODI match is won when one side has scored more runs than the total runs scored by the opposing side during their innings. If both sides have completed both their allocated innings and the side that fielded last has the higher aggregate of runs, it is known as a win by runs. This indicates the number of runs that they had scored more than the opposing side. If the side batting last wins the match, it is known as a win by wickets, indicating the number of wickets that were still to fall.

Greatest win margins (by runs)
The greatest winning margin by runs in ODIs is India's victory over Sri Lanks by 317 runs in the third and last ODI of the 2023 ODI series between the two teams.

Greatest win margins (by balls remaining)
The greatest winning margin by balls remaining in ODIs was England's victory over Canada by 8 wickets with 277 balls remaining in the 1979 Cricket World Cup. The largest victory recorded by India, which is the joint-15th largest victory, is during the 2001 Tri Series in South Africa against Kenya when they won by 10 wickets with 231 balls remaining.

Greatest win margins (by 10 wickets)
A total of 55 matches have ended with the chasing team winning by 10 wickets with West Indies winning by such margins a record 10 times. India have won an ODI match by a margin of 10 wickets on 6 occasions.

Highest successful run chases
South Africa holds the record for the highest successful run chase which they achieved when they scored 438/9 in response to Australia's 434/9. India's highest innings total while chasing is 362/1 in a successful run chase against Australia at Jaipur in October 2013.

Narrowest win margins (by runs)
The narrowest run margin victory is by 1 run which has been achieved in 31 ODI's with Australia winning such games a record 6 times. India's has achieved victory by 1 run four times.

Narrowest win margins (by balls remaining)
The narrowest winning margin by balls remaining in ODIs is by winning of the last ball which has been achieved 36 times with both South Africa winning seven times. India has achieved victory by this margin only once when they defeated Bangladesh during the 2018 Asia Cup in Dubai in September 2018.

Narrowest win margins (by wickets)

The narrowest margin of victory by wickets is 1 wicket which has settled 55 such ODIs. Both West Indies and New Zealand have recorded such victory on eight occasions. India has won the match by a margin of one wicket on three occasions.

Greatest loss margins (by runs)
India's biggest defeat by runs was against Sri Lanka in the final of the 2000 Coca-Cola Champions Trophy against Sri Lanka at Sharjah, UAE.

Greatest loss margins (by balls remaining)
The greatest winning margin by balls remaining in ODIs was England's victory over Canada by 8 wickets with 277 balls remaining in the 1979 Cricket World Cup. The largest defeat suffered by India was against New Zealand in New Zealand when they lost by 8 wickets with 212 balls remaining.

Greatest loss margins (by 10 wickets)
India have lost an ODI match by a margin of 10 wickets on 6 occasions with most recent being during the second ODI of the Australia's tour of India in 2023.

Narrowest loss margins (by runs)
The narrowest loss of India in terms of runs is by 1 run suffered four times.

Narrowest loss margins (by balls remaining)
The narrowest winning margin by balls remaining in ODIs is by winning of the last ball which has been achieved 36 times with both South Africa winning seven times. India has suffered loss by this margin five times.

Narrowest loss margins (by wickets)
India has suffered defeat by 1 wicket 5 times with most recent being against Pakistan during the 2014 Asia Cup.

Tied matches 
A tie can occur when the scores of both teams are equal at the conclusion of play, provided that the side batting last has completed their innings. 
There have been 37 ties in ODIs history with India involved in 9 such games.

Individual records

Batting records

Most career runs
A run is the basic means of scoring in cricket.
India's Sachin Tendulkar with 18,246 runs in ODIs is the leading run scorer followed by Kumar Sangakkara of Sri Lanka with 14,234 runs and Ricky Ponting from Australia with 13,704. Virat Kohli, Rahul Dravid, Saurav Ganguly and MS Dhoni are the only other Indian batsmen who have scored more than 10,000 runs in ODIs.

Fastest runs getter

Most runs in each batting position

Most runs against each team

Highest individual score
The fourth ODI of the Sri Lanka's tour of India in 2014 saw Rohit Sharma score the highest Individual score.

Highest individual score – progression of record

Most individual score in each batting position

Highest score against each opponent

Highest career average
A batsman's batting average is the total number of runs they have scored divided by the number of times they have been dismissed.

Highest Average in each batting position

Most half-centuries
A half-century is a score of between 50 and 99 runs. Statistically, once a batsman's score reaches 100, it is no longer considered a half-century but a century.

Sachin Tendulkar of India has scored the most half-centuries in ODIs with 96. He is followed by the Sri Lanka's Kumar Sangakkara on 93, South Africa's Jacques Kallis on 86 and India's Rahul Dravid and Pakistan's Inzamam-ul-Haq on 83.

Most centuries
A century is a score of 100 or more runs in a single innings.

Tendulkar has also scored the most centuries in ODIs with 49. India's Virat Kohli is next on 46 and Ricky Ponting with 30 hundreds is in third.

Most Sixes

Most Fours

Highest strike rates
Andre Russell of West Indies holds the record for highest strike rate, with minimum 500 balls faced qualification, with 130.22.Hardik Pandya is the Indian with the highest strike rate.

Highest strike rates in an inning
James Franklin of New Zealand's strike rate of 387.50 during his 31* off 8 balls against Canada during 2011 Cricket World Cup is the world record for highest strike rate in an innings. Zaheer Khan is the highest rated Indian on this list.

Most runs in a calendar year
Tendulkar holds the record for most runs scored in a calendar year with 1894 runs scored in 1998.

Most runs in a series
The 1980-81 Benson & Hedges World Series Cup in Australia saw Greg Chappell set the record for the most runs scored in a single series scoring 685 runs. He is followed by Sachin Tendulkar with 673 runs scored in the 2003 Cricket World Cup.

Most ducks
A duck refers to a batsman being dismissed without scoring a run. 
Sanath Jayasuriya has scored the equal highest number of ducks in ODIs with 34 such knocks. Tendulkar holds the dubious record for India.

Bowling records

Most career wickets 
A bowler takes the wicket of a batsman when the form of dismissal is bowled, caught, leg before wicket, stumped or hit wicket. If the batsman is dismissed by run out, obstructing the field, handling the ball, hitting the ball twice or timed out the bowler does not receive credit.

India's Anil Kumble is tenth on the list taking 334 wickets.

Fastest wicket taker

Most career wickets against each team

Best figures in an innings 
Bowling figures refers to the number of the wickets a bowler has taken and the number of runs conceded.
Sri Lanka's Chaminda Vaas holds the world record for best figures in an innings when he took 8/19 against Zimbabwe in December 2001 at Colombo (SSC). Stuart Binny holds the Indian record for best bowling figures.

Best figures in an innings – progression of record

Best Bowling Figure against each opponent

Best career average 
A bowler's bowling average is the total number of runs they have conceded divided by the number of wickets they have taken.
Afghanistan's Rashid Khan holds the record for the best career average in ODIs with 18.54. Joel Garner, West Indian cricketer, and a member of the highly regarded late 1970s and early 1980s West Indies cricket teams, is second behind Rashid with an overall career average of 18.84 runs per wicket. Jasprit Bumrah of India is the highest ranked Indian when the qualification of 2000 balls bowled is followed.

Best career economy rate 
A bowler's economy rate is the total number of runs they have conceded divided by the number of overs they have bowled.
West Indies' Joel Garner, holds the ODI record for the best career economy rate with 3.09. India's Kapil Dev, with a rate of 3.71 runs per over conceded over his 225-match ODI career, is the highest Indian on the list.

Best career strike rate 
A bowler's strike rate is the total number of balls they have bowled divided by the number of wickets they have taken.
The top bowler with the best ODI career strike rate is South Africa's Lungi Ngidi with strike rate of 23.2 balls per wicket. India's Mohammed Shami is at 10th position in this list.

Most four-wickets (& over) hauls in an innings 
Ajit Agarkar is joint-15th on the list of most four-wicket hauls with Pakistan's Waqar Younis, Sri Lanka's Muttiah Muralitharan and Australia's Brett Lee leading this list in ODIs.

Most five-wicket hauls in a match 
A five-wicket haul refers to a bowler taking five wickets in a single innings.
Javagal Srinath and Harbhajan Singh are the highest ranked Indians on the list of most five-wicket hauls which is headed by Pakistan's Waqar Younis with 13 such hauls.

Best economy rates in an inning 
The best economy rate in an inning, when a minimum of 30 balls are delivered by the player, is West Indies player Phil Simmons economy of 0.30 during his spell of 3 runs for 4 wickets in 10 overs against Pakistan at Sydney Cricket Ground in the 1991–92 Australian Tri-Series. Bishan Bedi holds the Indian record during his spell in 1975 Cricket World Cup against East Africa at Headingley.

Best strike rates in an inning 
The best strike rate in an inning, when a minimum of 4 wickets are taken by the player, is shared by Sunil Dhaniram of Canada, Paul Collingwood of England and Virender Sehwag of India when they achieved a striekk rate of 4.2 balls pr wicket.

Worst figures in an innings 
The worst figures in an ODI came in the 5th One Day International between South Africa at home to Australia in 2006. Australia's Mick Lewis returned figures of 0/113 from his 10 overs in the second innings of the match. The worst figures by an Indian is 0/88 that came off the bowling of Zaheer Khan in the first ODI of the Sri Lanka's tour of India in 009 and off the bowling of Yuzvendra Chahal against England during the 2019 Cricket World Cup.

Most runs conceded in a match 
Mick Lewis also holds the dubious distinction of most runs conceded in an ODI during the aforementioned match. The Indian record in ODIs is held by Bhuvneshwar Kumar in the fifth ODI against South Africa at the Wankhede Stadium in October 2015. He returned figures of 1/106 from his 10 overs.

Most wickets in a calendar year 
Pakistan's Saqlain Mushtaq holds the record for most wickets taken in a year when he took 69 wickets in 1997 in 36 ODIs. India's Anil Kumble is joint-fifth on the list having taken 61 wickets in 1996.

Most wickets in a series 
1998–99 Carlton and United Series involving Australia, England and Sri Lanka and the 2019 Cricket World Cup saw the records set for the most wickets taken by a bowler in an ODI series when Australian pacemen Glenn McGrath and Mitchell Starc achieved a total of 27 wickets during the series, respectively. India's Zaheer Khan is joint 16th with his 21 wickets taken during the 2011 Cricket World Cup.

Hat-trick 
In cricket, a hat-trick occurs when a bowler takes three wickets with consecutive deliveries. The deliveries may be interrupted by an over bowled by another bowler from the other end of the pitch or the other team's innings, but must be three consecutive deliveries by the individual bowler in the same match. Only wickets attributed to the bowler count towards a hat-trick; run outs do not count.
In ODIs history there have been just 49 hat-tricks, the first achieved by Jalal-ud-Din for Pakistan against Australia in 1982.

Wicket-keeping records
The wicket-keeper is a specialist fielder who stands behind the stumps being guarded by the batsman on strike and is the only member of the fielding side allowed to wear gloves and leg pads.

Most career dismissals 
A wicket-keeper can be credited with the dismissal of a batsman in two ways, caught or stumped. A fair catch is taken when the ball is caught fully within the field of play without it bouncing after the ball has touched the striker's bat or glove holding the bat, Laws 5.6.2.2 and 5.6.2.3 state that the hand or the glove holding the bat shall be regarded as the ball striking or touching the bat while a stumping occurs when the wicket-keeper puts down the wicket while the batsman is out of his ground and not attempting a run.
India's MS Dhoni is third in taking most dismissals in ODIs as a designated wicket-keeper behind Sri Lanka's Kumar Sangakkara and Australian Adam Gilchrist.

Most career catches 
Dhoni is fourth in taking most catches in ODIs as a designated wicket-keeper behind Gilchrist, Sangakkara and South Africa's Mark Boucher.

Most career stumpings 
Dhoni holds the record for the most stumpings in ODIs with 123 followed by Sri Lankans Sangakkara and Romesh Kaluwitharana.

Most dismissals in an innings 
Ten wicket-keepers on 15 occasions have taken six dismissals in a single innings in an ODI. Adam Gilchrist of Australia alone has done it six times. Dhoni is the only Indian to achieve this feat in 2007 against England.

The feat of taking 5 dismissals in an innings has been achieved by 49 wicket-keepers on 87 occasions including 6 Indians.

Most dismissals in a series 
Gilchrist also holds the ODIs record for the most dismissals taken by a wicket-keeper in a series. He made 27 dismissals during the 1998-99 Carlton & United Series. Indian record is held by MS Dhoni when he made 21 dismissals during the 2007–08 Commonwealth Bank Series.

Fielding records

Most career catches 

Caught is one of the nine methods a batsman can be dismissed in cricket. The majority of catches are caught in the slips, located behind the batsman, next to the wicket-keeper, on the off side of the field. Most slip fielders are top order batsmen.

Sri Lanka's Mahela Jayawardene holds the record for the most catches in ODIs by a non-wicket-keeper with 218, followed by Ricky Ponting of Australia on 160 and Indian Mohammad Azharuddin with 156.

Most catches in an innings 
South Africa's Jonty Rhodes is the only fielder to have taken five catches in an innings.

The feat of taking 4 catches in an innings has been achieved by 42 fielders on 44 occasions including 7 Indians.

Most catches in a series 
The 2019 Cricket World Cup, which was won by England for the first time, saw the record set for the most catches taken by a non-wicket-keeper in an ODI series. Englishman batsman and captain of the England Test team Joe Root took 13 catches in the series as well as scored 556 runs. Australia's Allan Border and India's V. V. S. Laxman are equal second behind Root with 12 catches taken during the 1988–89 Australian Tri-Series and during the 2003–04 VB Series respectively. Four players have taken 11 catches in a series on four occasions with Carl Hooper, Allan Border, Jeremy Coney and Ricky Ponting having done so.

All-round Records

1000 runs and 100 wickets 
A total of 64 players have achieved the double of 1000 runs and 100 wickets in their ODI career.

250 runs and 5 wickets in a series 
A total of 50 players on 103 occasions have achieved the double of 250 runs and 5 wickets in a series.

Other records

Most career matches 
India's Sachin Tendulkar holds the record for the most ODI matches played with 463, with former captains Mahela Jayawardene and Sanath Jayasuriya being second and third having represented Sri Lanka on 443 and 441 occasions, respectively.

Most consecutive career matches 
Tendulkar also holds the record for the most consecutive ODI matches played with 185. He broke Richie Richardson's long standing record of 132 matches.

Most matches as captain 

Ricky Ponting, who led the Australian cricket team from 2002 to 2012, holds the record for the most matches played as captain in ODIs with 230 (including 1 as captain of ICC World XI team).Mahendra Singh Dhoni who led the side for nine years from 2008 to 2017 is third on the list with 200 matches.

Most matches won as a captain

Most man of the match awards

Most man of the series awards

Youngest players on Debut 
The youngest player to play in an ODI match is claimed to be Hasan Raza at the age of 14 years and 233 days. Making his debut for Pakistan against Zimbabwe on 30 October 1996, there is some doubt as to the validity of Raza's age at the time. The youngest Indian to play ODIs was Sachin Tendulkar who at the age of 16 years and 238 days debuted in the second ODI of the series against Pakistan in December 1989.

Oldest players on Debut 
The Netherlands batsmen Nolan Clarke is the oldest player to appear in an ODI match. Playing in the 1996 Cricket World Cup against New Zealand in 1996 at Reliance Stadium in Vadodara, India he was aged 47 years and 240 days. Farokh Engineer is the oldest Indian ODI debutant when he played India's first ever ODI during the 1974 England tour at the Headingley.

Oldest players 
The Netherlands batsmen Nolan Clarke is the oldest player to appear in an ODI match. Playing in the 1996 Cricket World Cup against South Africa in 1996 at Rawalpindi Cricket Stadium in Rawalpindi, Pakistan he was aged 47 years and 257 days.

Partnership records
In cricket, two batsmen are always present at the crease batting together in a partnership. This partnership will continue until one of them is dismissed, retires or the innings comes to a close.

Highest partnerships by wicket
A wicket partnership describes the number of runs scored before each wicket falls. The first wicket partnership is between the opening batsmen and continues until the first wicket falls. The second wicket partnership then commences between the not out batsman and the number three batsman. This partnership continues until the second wicket falls. The third wicket partnership then commences between the not out batsman and the new batsman. This continues down to the tenth wicket partnership. When the tenth wicket has fallen, there is no batsman left to partner so the innings is closed.

Highest partnerships by runs
The highest ODI partnership by runs for any wicket is held by the West Indian pairing of Chris Gayle and Marlon Samuels who put together a second wicket partnership of 372 runs during the 2015 Cricket World Cup against Zimbabwe in February 2015. This broke the record of 331 runs set by Indian pair of Sachin Tendulkar and Rahul Dravid against New Zealand in 1999

Highest overall partnership runs by a pair

Umpiring records

Most matches umpired
An umpire in cricket is a person who officiates the match according to the Laws of Cricket. Two umpires adjudicate the match on the field, whilst a third umpire has access to video replays, and a fourth umpire looks after the match balls and other duties. The records below are only for on-field umpires.

Aleem Dar of Pakistan holds the record for the most ODI matches umpired with 211, followed by New Zealand's Billy Bowden who officiated in 200 matches. The most experienced Indian is Srinivas Venkataraghavan who stood in 52 ODI matches.

See also

List of One Day International cricket records
List of India Test cricket records
List of India Twenty20 International records

Notes

References

One Day International cricket records
Lists of Indian cricket records and statistics